Poornachandra Tejaswi (Kannada: ಪೂಣ೯ಚಂದ್ರ ತೇಜಸ್ವಿ)  is an Indian film composer, lyricist and playback singer who primarily works in Kannada Film Industry. His film debut  made through Pawan Kumar directorial 'Lucia',the film's background score, lyrics and songs received acclaims and honors both from audience and critics.

Personal life 

Poornachandra Tejaswi was born (6 October 1982) into a teaching parentage. He hails from the historical town of Srirangapatna in Mandya District, Karnataka. Poornachandra Tejaswi did his bachelor's degree in Engineering from NIE College, Mysore and worked as a software engineer in Mysore for few years. He belongs to that group of artists in Kannada Film Industry who came from Theatre background; he was part of the Rock band - Stone age and is an active member of Niranthara foundation (a theatre group).

Journey into Films 
Poornachandra Tejaswi began his film journey through critically acclaimed Lucia in 2013. He quotes "Pawan Kumar, on a social networking site, asked interested musicians to send him samples of their works and I like hundreds of others did so. Pawan immediately responded and even before I realised was a part of Team Lucia".The song with track voice of "Thinbedakammi" was a huge hit when released on YouTube, it is noteworthy here to mention that Tejaswi penned the lyrics and was also lead playback singer for the song which instantly grabbed attention. He also composed the background score for the film. Lucia album was a massive hit and contributed immensely for the success of the film. What followed after the release was a series of nominations and awards including prestigious Karnataka State Award - 2014.

Discography

Awards 
 Karnataka State Award 2014 - For Best music director for Lucia
 Filmfare Award (2014) - Best Male Playback Singer for Lucia
 Mirchi award (2014) - Upcoming Music Composer for Lucia
 Big FM Award (2014) - Best Debut song for Lucia
 Raghavendra Chitravani award (2014) - Best Music Director for Lucia
 Santhosham Cine Award Hyderabad (2014) - Best Music Director for Lucia
 Santhosham Cine Award Hyderabad (2014) - Best Playback Singer for Lucia
 KIMA Award (2014) - Best Background score for Lucia

Nominations 
SIIMA award (2014) - Best Music Director category
 SIIMA award (2014) - Best Lyricist category

References

External links 

Living people
1982 births
Singers from Bangalore
Indian male playback singers
Indian composers
21st-century Indian composers
Kannada playback singers
Kannada film score composers
21st-century Indian singers
Film musicians from Karnataka
Male film score composers
21st-century Indian male singers